Noh Kyung-eun (born March 11, 1984) is a South Korean professional baseball player who is a free agent.

Career
He represented the Korea national baseball team at the 2013 World Baseball Classic.

After the end of the 2018 season, he qualified for the FA, but failed to save the team for a year after breaking up with his team. Then, he signed with Lotte Giants for two years and 1.1 billion won ahead of the 2020 season.

Filmography

Television show

References

External links 
 Career statistics and player information from Korea Baseball Organization
 Baseball America

KBO League pitchers
1984 births
Living people
Lotte Giants players
Doosan Bears players
2013 World Baseball Classic players
Sportspeople from South Jeolla Province
Gyoha No clan
South Korean expatriate baseball players in Australia